Florian Mayer chose to not defend his 2009 title.Grigor Dimitrov won this year's event by beating Konstantin Kravchuk 6–1, 6–4 in the final.

Seeds

Draw

Finals

Top half

Bottom half

References
Main Draw
Qualifying Singles

Singles
Chang-Sat Bangkok Open - Singles
 in Thai tennis